International Graduate Business School (IGBS) Zagreb is designed to meet the need for management education in Croatia and the region. IGBS Zagreb offers dual MBA/M.Sc. degree in partnership with Kelley School of Business, Indiana University.

A Croatian public research centre in the field of economics, The Institute of Economics, Zagreb, founded IGBS Zagreb as a private business school in 2003 with support of a grant from U.S. Department of State.

Academics

Dual degree M.B.A. /M.Sc. in Strategic Management 
IGBS Zagreb conducts Dual Degree MBA/M.Sc. Program in Strategic Management in Croatia in partnership with Kelley School of Business, Indiana University. Kelley School of Business faculty teach the majority of the courses, joined by research faculty from The Institute of Economics, Zagreb. Graduates receive a Bologna compliant degree from IGBS Zagreb, in addition to an M.Sc. degree in Strategic Management from Kelley School of Business.

Kelley Direct M.Sc. in Finance

Kelley Direct M.Sc. in Global Supply Chain Management 
IGBS Zagreb graduates can obtain further specialization through on‐line M.Sc. Programs at Kelley School of Business (Kelley Direct programs). Tracks available are Global Supply Chain or Finance. Graduates receive an M.Sc. degree in Finance or Global Supply Chain from Kelley School of Business.

Notable alumni 
Sandro Baričević, Business Communications Director Europe, The Coca-Cola Company
Luka Mađerić, Head of Human Rights Office, Government of the Republic of Croatia
Tomislav Krmpotić, Second Vice-President, American Chamber of Commerce in Croatia
Ninoslav Kikaš, Head of Finance, Esplanade Zagreb Luxury Hotel Esplanade Zagreb Hotel
Janko Štefanek, Executive Director of Financial Services, Genera Inc. for development and production of pharmaceuticals
Igor Čupić, member of the Board, Armex gradnja d.o.o., Zagreb-based construction & real estate firm
Marija Vojnović, director of Euroconsilium d.o.o., Zagreb-based EU funds consultancy

See also 
 List of institutions of higher education in Croatia

References 

MBA uvijek donosi prednost ispred ostalih, Poslovni dnevnik, 16 February 2011 
Online edukacija idealna za zaposlenog menadžera, Poslovni dnevnik, 4 November 2010 
Online učenjem menadžment se vježba na daljinu, Lider, 21 October 2010 
Hrvatskim studentima i američka diploma, Lider, May 23, 2012 

Universities and colleges in Croatia